Ram Pal Rajwanshi is an Indian politician and a member of the 16th Legislative Assembly in India. He represents the Misrikh constituency of Uttar Pradesh and is a member of the Samajwadi Party political party.

Early life and  education
Ram Pal Rajwanshi was born in Sitapur district. He attended the junior high school in Madhrehatta and is educated till eighth grade. Ram Pal belongs to the scheduled caste community.

Political career
Ram Pal Rajwanshi has been a MLA for three terms. He has also been Minister of State for two terms and has been the president of many community and committees. He represented the Misrikh constituency and is a member of the Samajwadi Party political party.

Posts held

See also
 Misrikh (Assembly constituency)
 Sixteenth Legislative Assembly of Uttar Pradesh
 Uttar Pradesh Legislative Assembly

References 

1958 births
Living people
People from Sitapur district
Samajwadi Party politicians
Uttar Pradesh MLAs 1997–2002
Uttar Pradesh MLAs 2007–2012
Uttar Pradesh MLAs 2012–2017
Uttar Pradesh politicians